Meraxes is a genus of carcharodontosaurid theropod dinosaur from the Late Cretaceous Huincul Formation of Argentine Patagonia. The genus contains a single species, Meraxes gigas.

Discovery and naming 
The holotype of Meraxes, previously called the "Campanas carcharodontosaurid", MMCh-PV 65, was discovered in 2012. Known bones include a nearly complete skull, pectoral and pelvic elements, partial forelimbs, complete hindlimbs, fragmentary ribs and cervical and dorsal vertebrae, a sacrum, and several complete caudal vertebrae. It has the most complete carcharodontosaurid skeleton known from the Southern Hemisphere.

Meraxes gigas was described in 2022 by Canale et al. based on these remains. The generic name, "Meraxes", honors a dragon from the George R.R. Martin fantasy novel series, A Song of Ice and Fire. The specific name, "gigas", is derived from a Greek word meaning "giant", in reference to its large size.

Description 

The shapes and proportions of various bones (i.e. skull, scapula, metacarpals, ischial shaft, foot, etc.) indicate that Meraxes and Acrocanthosaurus had similar proportions and body size. It also possessed reduced forelimbs, an instance of convergent evolution that occurred independently in four different lineages: Carcharodontosauridae, Abelisauridae, Tyrannosauridae, and Alvarezsauridae. Additionally, the second toes possess an enlarged claw, almost twice as long as the claw on the fourth toe.

Osteohistological analysis of the holotype suggests the individual could have been between 39 and 53 years old when it died, having reached skeletal maturity approximately 4 years prior to its death (between 35 and 49 years old), making it the longest-lived non-avian theropod currently known. Meraxes was also determined to have grown to large size by extending its growth period (hypermorphosis), rather than increasing its relative growth rate (acceleration) through development as in Tyrannosaurus, to which it was compared.

Classification 
Meraxes represents the earliest diverging member of the tribe Giganotosaurini within the Carcharodontosauridae. The cladogram below displays the results of the phylogenetic analysis by Canale et al.

Paleoenvironment 

The fossil remains of Meraxes were recovered from the Huincul Formation. A substantial number of taxa are known to have inhabited this paleoenvironment. The theropods of the area are represented by the paravian Overoraptor, the elaphrosaurine Huinculsaurus, the abelisaurs Skorpiovenator, Tralkasaurus, and Ilokelesia, the fellow giant carcharodontosaurid Mapusaurus, and the megaraptoran Aoniraptor. However, Meraxes was found in an older rock layer than Mapusaurus, so they probably did not coexist. The herbivores of the area are represented by the rebbachisaurid sauropods Cathartesaura and Limaysaurus, the titanosaurs Argentinosaurus and Choconsaurus, and indeterminate iguanodonts.

References 

Carcharodontosaurids
Cenomanian life
Cretaceous Argentina
Fossil taxa described in 2022
Fossils of Argentina
Huincul Formation
Late Cretaceous dinosaurs of South America
Turonian life